For All Moonkind, Inc. is an entirely volunteer international nonprofit organization which is working with the United Nations and the international community to manage the preservation of history and human heritage in outer space. The organization believes that the lunar landing sites and items from space missions are of great value to the public and is pushing the United Nations to create rules that will protect lunar items and secure heritage sites on the Moon and other celestial bodies. Protection is necessary as many nations and companies are planning on returning to the Moon, and it is not difficult to imagine the damage an autonomous vehicle or an errant astronaut—an explorer, colonist or tourist—could to one of the Moon landing sites, whether intentionally or unintentionally.

Formed in 2017, the organization aims to work with space agencies around the world to draw up a protection plan which will be submitted to the UN Committee on the Peaceful Uses of Outer Space. The goal is to present the international community with a proposal prepared by a diverse group of space law experts, preservation law experts, scientists and engineers which takes into consideration all the necessary aspects of law, policy and science. The effort will be modeled on the United Nations Educational, Scientific and Cultural Organization's World Heritage Convention. Simonetta Di Pippo, currently the director of the United Nations Office for Outer Space Affairs, has acknowledged the work of For All Moonkind and confirmed that UNOOSA supports and facilitates international cooperation in the peaceful uses of outer space. In November 2017, the UNOOSA United Arab Emirates High Level Forum 2017 acknowledged the work of For All Moonkind and recommended that the international community should consider proclaiming universal heritage sites in outer space. In January 2018, a draft resolution was considered by the UN Committee on the Peaceful Uses of Outer Space Scientific and Technical Subcommittee recommended the creations of "a universal space heritage sites programme ... with specific focus on sites of special relevance on the Moon and other celestial bodies."

For All Moonkind is also working directly private companies to preserve human heritage in outer space. German company PTScientists, which is planning to send a rover to revisit the Apollo 17 landing site, was the first private company to make a public pledge of support for For All Moonkind.

In February 2018, For All Moonkind was named a Top Ten Innovator in Space in 2018 "for galvanizing agencies to preserve Moon artifacts." The honor was repeated in 2019 when the organization was recognized for its innovative "campaign to create and international agreement to preserve human artifacts in space." In May 2018, the organization announced that it is teaming up with TODAQ Financial to map heritage sites on the Moon using blockchain. In December 2018, the United Nations General Assembly granted to For All Moonkind Observer status, on a provisional basis, for a period of three years, pending on the status of their application for consultative status with the United Nations Economic and Social Council.

In spring 2019, For All Moonkind worked closely with the office of Gary Peters to develop the One Small Step Act, legislation designed to permanently protect the Apollo landing sites from intentional and unintentional disturbances by codifying existing NASA preservation recommendations. The bipartisan bill, which was cosponsored by Senator Ted Cruz was passed unanimously by the United States Senate on 18 July 2019. In the United States House of Representatives, it was cosponsored by Representatives Eddie Bernice Johnson, Brian Babin, Kendra Horn, Frank Lucas (Oklahoma politician), Lizzie Fletcher and Brian Fitzpatrick (American politician). It was passed by the United States House of Representatives in December 2020 and became law on 31 December 2021.

In October 2020, the United States and seven other countries signed the Artemis Accords. Section 9 of the Accords specifically includes the agreement to preserve outer space heritage, which the signatories consider to comprise historically significant human or robotic landing sites, artifacts, spacecraft, and other evidence of activity, and to contribute to multinational efforts to develop practices and rules to do so. This is the first time the protection of human heritage in space has ever been referenced in a multilateral agreement. As of 30 October, a total of 13 nations have signed the Accords.

In March 2021, the organization revealed the first-of-its-kind digital registry of all the historic landing sites on the Moon. The For All Moonkind Moon Registry is free to all. Astronaut and second-to-last human on the Moon, Harrison Schmitt called the registry a "worthy cause", while fellow astronaut and moonwalker Charles Duke said it is a "spectacular resource". Neil Armstrong biographer James Hansen calls it "an all-access pass to the history of human activity on the Moon."

Human heritage in outer space 
Space heritage has been defined as heritage related to the process of carrying our science in space; heritage related to crewed space flight/exploration; and human cultural heritage that remains off the surface of planet Earth. The field of space archaeology is the research-based study of all the various human-made items in outer space. Human heritage in outer space includes the Apollo 11 lunar landing site and the robotic and crewed sites that preceded and followed Apollo 11. This also comprises all the Luna programme vehicles, including the Luna 2 (first object) and Luna 9 (first soft-landing) missions, the Surveyor program and Yutu.

Human heritage in outer space also includes satellites like Vanguard 1 and Asterix-1 which, though nonoperational, remain in orbit.

History
The organization was founded by Tim and Michelle Hanlon in 2017.

In February 2018, For All Moonkind was named a Top Ten Innovator in Space in 2018 "for galvanizing agencies to preserve Moon artifacts." The honor was repeated in 2019 when the organization was recognized for its innovative "campaign to create and international agreement to preserve human artifacts in space."

In May 2018, the organization announced that it is teaming up with TODAQ Financial to map heritage sites on the Moon using blockchain.

In December 2018, the United Nations General Assembly granted to For All Moonkind observer status, on a provisional basis, for a period of three years, pending on the status of their application for consultative status with the United Nations Economic and Social Council.

In spring 2019, For All Moonkind worked closely with the office of Gary Peters to develop the One Small Step Act, legislation designed to permanently protect the Apollo landing sites from intentional and unintentional disturbances by codifying existing NASA preservation recommendations. The bipartisan bill, which was cosponsored by Senator Ted Cruz was passed unanimously by the United States Senate on 18 July 2019. It passed the House in December 2020 and became law on 31 December 2020.

Leadership and Advisory Councils
For All Moonkind is an entirely volunteer endeavor with a Leadership Board and three Advisory Councils. The team includes space lawyers and policymakers, scientists and technical experts – including space archaeologists – and communications professionals from around the world.

Noteworthy members include:

 Dr. Ram Jakhu, former director of McGill University's Institute of Air and Space Law
 Dr. Joseph Pelton, Director Emeritus of the Space & Advanced Communications Research Institute at the George Washington University
 Dr. David Kendall, past Chair of the UN Committee on the Peaceful Uses of Outer Space
 American Advertising Federation Hall of Fame member David A. Bell
 Astronaut Col. Mike Mullane, USAF, Retired
 Astronaut Col. Robert C. Springer, USMC, Retired
 American space historian Robert Pearlman
 James R. Hansen, author of First Man: The Life of Neil A. Armstrong, the official biography of Neil Armstrong
 Derek Webber, an official judge of the Google Lunar XPRIZE competition
 Space entrepreneur Rick Tumlinson 
 Elina Morozova, a member of the Board of Directors of the International Institute of Space Law
 Dr. Andrea Harrington, Associate Director of the LL.M Program in Air and Space Law at the University of Mississippi School of Law
 Dr. Dale Stephens from the University of Adelaide
 Mr. Mohamed Amara, General Counsel for the United Arab Emirates Space Agency
 Rahul Narayan, Founder of TeamIndus
 Kevin Myrick, of Synergy Moon
 Entrepreneur, venture capitalist and author, Nova Spivack
 Inventor and entrepreneur, John Goscha
 Archaeologist Dr. Alice Gorman, from Flinders University 
 Space archaeologists Dr. Beth Laura O'Leary of New Mexico State University and Dr. Lisa Westwood of California State University, Chico who are also co-authors, along with Wayne Donaldson, of the recently published The Final Mission: Preserving NASA's Apollo Sites
 Humaid Al-Shamsi, Legal Counsel to the Dubai South development
 Dr. Roy Balleste of St. Thomas University School of Law
 Gilles Doucet, formerly of the Canadian Department of National Defence

References

External links
 ">"Moon Registry" Catalogs Human Heritage Left Behind on Lunar Surface collectSPACE
 "> Moon Registry: Cataloging the Past ... and Future of Lunar Exploration Inside Outer Space
 President Signs Law Protecting Lunar Heritage Sites SpacePolicyOnline.com
 " Protecting Human Heritage in Outer Space with Michelle L.D. Hanlon Clayming Space
 " How Star Trek's Prime Directive is Influencing Real-Time Space Law SyFyWire
 Pushing the Outer Limits of Preservation with Michelle Hanlon PreserveCast
 Fighting to Preserve Human History on the Moon Supercluster
 We Need that Boot Print. Inside the Fight to Save the Moon's Historic Sites Before it's Too Late Time
 The Nation Celebrates the 50th Anniversary of Apollo 11 The Wall Street Journal
 European Space Agency Chief Urges Humanity to Protect Apollo 11, Lunokhod 1 Landing Sites Gizmodo
 Life After Launch: Inside the Massive Effort to Preserve NASA's Space Artifacts Digital Trends
 Apollo 11 Site Should be Granted Heritage Status The Guardian
 What is the Apollo 11 Landing Site Like Now? The Atlantic
 Preserving Apollo's Historic Landing Sites on the Moon WJCT
 Preserving Neil Armstrong's Footprints on the Moon is an Easy Decision Slate
 One Giant Leap for Preservation: Kent Wins Landmark Status for Boeing's Moon Buggies GeekWire
 America's Greatest Space Landmarks Could be at Risk Due to a Lack of Space Law Cheddar
 Should Neil Armstrong's Bootprints Be on the Moon Forever? The New York Times
 The Moon now has Hundreds of Artefacts - Should They be Protected? The Straits Times
 Apollo 11 Brought a Message of Peace to the Moon Snopes
 One Small Step: What Will the Moon Look Like in 50 Years? CNET
 Apollo Astronauts Left Trash, Mementos and Experiments on the Moon Science News
 Historic Preservation Taken Out of This World The Commercial Dispatch
 Apollo 11 50th Anniversary: Who Gets to Own Moon Landing Memorabilia Vox
 How a Park on the Moon Could Lead to More Consensus on Space Exploration Politico
 Space Act Calls for Protection of Apollo 11 Landing Site Space.com
 50 Yrs of Moon Landing: Let's Not Forget, or Forsake, the Lessons of the Past Business Standard
 " Preserving Human Cultural Heritage For All Moonkind Late Night Live
 How do You Preserve History on the Moon? National Public Radio
 " The Case for Protecting the Apollo Landing Areas as Heritage Sites Discover
 A World Heritage Site on the Moon? That's Not as Spacey as it Sounds Los Angeles Times
 Mapping the Moon WMFE-FM
 We Make Mars More Like Earth? Making New Worlds
 PTScientists 'Mission to the Moon' to Take Care not to Harm Apollo 17 Landing Site collectSPACE
 Return to the Moon, BBC Click talks to Michelle Hanlon, For All Moonkind BBC World Service, Click
 SpaceWatchME Interviews: Michelle L.D. Hanlon of For All Moonkind Space Watch Middle East
 Broadcast 2994, Michelle Hanlon The Space Show
 Preserving Historic Sites on the Moon Air & Space
 Non-profit strives to preserve moon landing sites for posterity The Westside Story 
 A Preservation Group Wants UNESCO-Style Protection for Apollo Moon-landing Sites Fast Company

Organizations established in 2017
Space advocacy organizations